Mikhail Ivanovich Ulyanov (born 23 August 1953) is a Russian foreign service officer who since 2018 has served as Russia's Permanent Representative to International Organizations in Vienna.

Biography
Mikhail Ulyanov graduated from the Moscow State Institute of History and Archives (MGIAI) in 1980.

From January 2004 to September 2006 he was a Deputy Director of the Department for Security and Disarmament Affairs of the Russian Foreign Ministry.

Since September 2006, he has been the head of the Russian delegation at the Vienna talks on military security and arms control.

From 2011 till 2014, he was Director of the Department for Security and Disarmament Affairs of the Russian Foreign Ministry.

From 2014 till 2017, he was Director of the Department for Non-Proliferation and Arms Control of the Russian Foreign Ministry.

Since 23 January 2018 he served as Russia's Permanent Representative to international organizations in Vienna (Austria).

During the Russian war against Ukraine
On 12 August 2022, he declared that anti-Russian sanctions had completely failed. On August 20, 2022, in response to the publication of the President of Ukraine Volodymyr Zelensky about the US armed assistance to Ukraine, Ulyanov wrote on the official Twitter channel: “No mercy for the Ukrainian population!” He subsequently deleted his post, apologizing and saying "I forgot who I'm dealing with". Analyst Olga Lautman commented on the removal: “The Chekist war criminal apologized for admitting that Russian military targets are Ukrainians. This part was to be kept secret.” Mykhailo Podolyak, adviser to the head of the President's Office in Ukraine, noted that the call for genocide of the Ukrainian people is unacceptable. Ulyanov called attempts to accuse him of calling for the genocide of the Ukrainian people outrageous, claiming his words “No mercy for the Ukrainian population” meant that the US supposedly does not have mercy for Ukrainians due to its armed assistance, not that he doesn't want mercy for Ukrainians.

References

External links 

 Биография на сайте МИД России
 Биография на сайте Постоянного представительства России при международных организациях в Вене

1958 births
Living people
Moscow State University alumni
Diplomats from Moscow
Ambassador Extraordinary and Plenipotentiary (Russian Federation)
Permanent Representatives to the United Nations in Vienna